Eugnosta lathoniana is a species of moth of the family Tortricidae. It is found in southern Europe (from the Iberian Peninsula to the Peloponnese and from Germany to the Ural Mountains and the Caucasus), North Africa (Algeria), Asia Minor, Armenia and Iran.

The wingspan is 21–27 mm. Adults are on wing from May to June.

References

Moths described in 1799
Eugnosta